The Városföld–Slobodnica pipeline is a bi-directional high pressure natural gas pipeline between Városföld in Hungary and Slobodnica in Croatia.  It is a part of the New European Transmission System. The pipeline is operated by FGSZ in Hungary and by Plinacro in Croatia.

The pipeline has compressor stations at Városföld and Báta, and international metering stations at Drávaszerdahely and Donji Miholjac. It cost €395 million.

References

Natural gas pipelines in Croatia
Natural gas pipelines in Hungary
Croatia–Hungary relations